Herminio is a male Spanish given name. The Portuguese equivalent of the name is Hermínio. It may refer to:

People with the given name
Herminio Ahumada (1899–1983), Mexican politician and former sprinter
Herminio Alcasid (born 1967), Filipino singer-songwriter
Herminio Aquino (1949–2021), Filipino businessman and politician
Herminio A. Astorga (1929–2004), Filipino politician
Herminio Bautista (1934–2017), Filipino comedian and director
Herminio Campos (born 1937), Peruvian footballer
Herminio Chávez (1918–2006), Mexican historian
Herminio Coloma Jr. (born 1953), Filipino businessman and educator
Herminio Dagohoy (born 1964), the 96th Rector Magnificus of the University of Santo Tomas, Philippines
Herminio de Brito (born 1914), Brazilian footballer
Herminio Brau del Toro (1922–1998), Puerto Rican lawyer
Herminio Disini, Filipino businessman closely related to the Marcos dictatorship
Herminio Giménez (1905–1991), Paraguayan composer
Herminio Hidalgo (born 1962), Panamanian wrestler
Herminio Iglesias (1929–2007), Argentine politician
Hermínio da Palma Inácio (1922–2009), Portuguese revolutionary
Herminio Lopez Roque Jr. (born 1966), Filipino lawyer and politician
Herminio Martínez (1896–1976), Spanish footballer
Hermínio Martinho (born 1946), Portuguese agricultural engineer and politician
Herminio Masantonio (1910–1956), Argentine footballer
Herminio Blanco Mendoza (born 1950), Mexican economist
Herminio Menéndez (born 1953), Spanish sprint canoer
Herminio Miranda (born 1985), Paraguayan footballer
Hermínio Pinzetta (1911–1972), Brazilian Roman Catholic
Hermínio Rebelo, Portuguese sports shooter
Herminio Toñánez (born 1946), Paraguayan footballer
Herminio Portell Vilá (1901–1992), Cuban writer and scholar
Herminio Díaz Zabala (born 1964), Spanish racing cyclist

People with the middle name
Iranildo Herminio Ferreira (born 1976), Brazilian footballer
Juan Herminio Cintrón García (1919–2012), Puerto Rican politician
Fábio Hermínio Hempel (born 1980), Brazilian footballer

See also
Erminio, Italian equivalent
Estádio Hermínio Ometto, an association football stadium in São Paulo, Brazil

Portuguese masculine given names
Spanish masculine given names